Wuf Ticket were an American hip hop group that consisted of Mustafa Ahmed, James Mason, Earl McField and Karin Wolf. In 1982, they released their debut single “Ya Mama” on Prelude Records. The song managed to peak at #21 on Billboard’s Black Singles chart, staying on the chart for 14 weeks. Their follow up single "The Key" did not chart at all.

Greaseman
Wuf Ticket’s “Ya Mama” achieved its greatest notoriety, and airplay, as a music bed for bits by shock jock The Greaseman on WWDC-FM in Washington, D.C. and later his nationally syndicated radio show where Greaseman would argue with a surly service industry worker.

References

African-American musical groups
Hip hop groups from New York City
History of hip hop
20th century in hip hop music
1980s in hip hop music